Judith Ngaire Tizard (born 3 January 1956) is a former New Zealand politician, and a member of the Labour Party.

Early life and career
Tizard was born at Auckland's St Helen's maternity hospital in Pitt Street in 1956. She was educated at Glendowie College. Born into a political family, her mother, Dame Catherine Tizard, served as Mayor of Auckland and as Governor-General and her father, Bob Tizard, was a prominent Labour Party cabinet minister and Deputy Prime Minister. She followed her parents into politics, joining the Labour Party herself in 1973.

After moving from Auckland to Wellington, when her father became a cabinet minister, Tizard began studying politics at Victoria University and got a job in the Labour Party Research Unit from 1976 to 1977. She became more enthusiastic about her work, spending more time in that than study before returning to Auckland and working as a cook in a restaurant owned by one of her friends. She was elected a member of the Auckland Electric Power Board in 1977, remaining a member until 1983. Her mother commented that it was "...another telling demonstration of the power of a recognisable name on a ticket. As she (Judith) said herself, who in their right mind would elect a 21-year-old barmaid to run a power board? That's how she had described herself on the ticket."

Later, Tizard finished her Bachelor of Arts (BA) in History from the University of Auckland. She became a waitress, restaurant owner, and manager of O'Connells Restaurant on O'Connell St in Auckland (1978–1982), and was involved in the catering industry (1981–1984). In 1986 she stood unsuccessfully for a seat on the Auckland City Council in 1986 in the central ward, but narrowly missed out on election. She was elected a member of the Auckland Regional Council in 1988. She was re-elected in 1989 before resigning in 1991.

Member of Parliament

She was an electorate secretary in the  electorate for Helen Clark from 1984 to 1987. At the  she contested Remuera again, reducing the majority of Doug Graham to just 406. From 1987 to 1990 she was an electorate secretary in the  electorate for her father. From 1987 to 1989 she was vice-president of the Auckland Regional Council of the Labour Party.

On his retirement she succeeded her father as Labour's candidate for Panmure. She entered Parliament at the 1990 election and in November 1990 she was appointed Labour's spokesperson for Immigration and Arts & Culture by Labour leader Mike Moore. In 1993, Tizard was awarded the New Zealand Suffrage Centennial Medal. In 1999, Tizard served as the Minister assisting the Prime Minister on Auckland issues, which would develop into the portfolio of Minister for Auckland Issues in 2002.

She became a Minister outside of Cabinet, serving as Minister of Consumer Affairs, Associate Minister for Arts, Culture and Heritage, Associate Minister of Transport, Associate Minister of Commerce, and Minister responsible for Archives New Zealand and the National Library.

Before the 2008 general election Tizard was given the list placing of 38, a relatively low one for a minister. She was then defeated in her electorate by National's Nikki Kaye by a margin of 1,497 votes. Her list placing meant she would not return to parliament unless Labour list MPs quit.

On 25 March 2011, Labour list MP Darren Hughes resigned from Parliament. Whilst Tizard was next in line, Labour Party president Andrew Little expressed preference for Louisa Wall to replace Hughes as she intended to contest the upcoming 2011 general election, unlike Tizard and the four other list candidates preceding Wall (Mark Burton, Mahara Okeroa, Martin Gallagher and Dave Hereora). Tizard, like her lower-ranked colleagues, decided not to take the seat.

Tizard now works in the constituency office of Phil Twyford, incumbent Member for Te Atatū.

Controversy

In 2008 Tizard championed an amendment to the Copyright Act, which required internet service providers (ISPs) to develop policies to terminate the Internet account of repeat copyright infringers. She defended this position when meeting Internet lobby groups, saying it is necessary to protect New Zealand artists, and referred to the release of New Zealand film Sione's Wedding, which, she claimed, was damaged by unlawful distribution on the Internet.

On 16 October 2008, a press release was published by Tizard responding to "alarmist claims made by a small group of IT commentators in the media that recent amendments to the Copyright Act would have ISPs cutting off the accounts of their users based on unsubstantiated accusations of copyright infringement. [...] This is quiet [sic] simply untrue, and I am sure they know it." That press release seems to have been retracted.

On 23 March 2009, the Prime Minister John Key announced that the law would not take effect and would be re-written.

Personal life
In 1993, aged 37, Tizard had a hysterectomy and surgery for uterine cancer from which she recovered.

Notes

References

External links

 Ministerial profile
 Judith Tizard's speech to Parliament at the passing of the amendment to the Copyright Act
 Six different lobby groups decry "A deeply flawed law that undermines fundamental rights and simply will not work."
 A meeting with Judith Tizard about copyright

|-

1956 births
New Zealand Labour Party MPs
Women members of the New Zealand House of Representatives
University of Auckland alumni
New Zealand MPs for Auckland electorates
Members of the New Zealand House of Representatives
Living people
Auckland regional councillors
Unsuccessful candidates in the 2008 New Zealand general election
Unsuccessful candidates in the 1987 New Zealand general election
Unsuccessful candidates in the 1981 New Zealand general election
21st-century New Zealand politicians
21st-century New Zealand women politicians
Recipients of the New Zealand Suffrage Centennial Medal 1993
Judith